Paul Wong may refer to:

Paul Wong (artist) (born 1954), Canadian artist
Paul Wong (musician) (born 1964), Hong Kong musician
Paul T. P. Wong (born 1937), Canadian psychologist